Andrew Kennedy may refer to:
Andrew Kennedy (American politician) (1810–1847), U.S. Representative from Indiana
Andrew Kennedy (basketball) (born 1965), retired American-Jamaican basketball player
Andrew Kennedy (Canadian politician) (1842–1904), contractor and politician from Quebec
Andrew Kennedy, cover name for Andrzej Kowerski (1912–1988), Polish Army officer and SOE agent in World War II
Andrew Kennedy (cricketer, born 1975), English cricketer
Andrew Kennedy (cricketer, born 1949), former English cricketer
Andrew Kennedy (tenor) (born 1977), English tenor
Andrew Karpati Kennedy (1931–2016), author and literary critic

See also
Andy Kennedy (disambiguation)